Marvin van der Pluijm (born 1 June 1988 in Rotterdam) is a Dutch footballer currently playing for vv Capelle in the Topklasse.

Career

Netherlands
van der Pluijm was part of the youth setup at his hometown team, Sparta Rotterdam, and played for Dutch senior youth side VV Alexandria '66, before turning professional with FC Den Bosch in the Dutch Eerste Divisie in 2009. He played 12 games for Den Bosch before moving to Eredivisie side NAC Breda in 2010. He scored his first professional goal in his only game for Breda, a 2-2 tie with NEC Nijmegen on 22 January 2011. After his move to the Dayton Dutch Lions he joined BVV Barendrecht in that same year.

United States
van der Pluijm moved to the United States in 2011 to play for the Dayton Dutch Lions in the USL Professional Division in 2011.

References

External links
 Dayton Dutch Lions profile

1988 births
Living people
Dutch footballers
Dutch expatriate footballers
FC Den Bosch players
NAC Breda players
Van der Pluijm, Marvin
Eredivisie players
Eerste Divisie players
Van der Pluijm, Marvin
Van der Pluijm, Marvin
Footballers from Rotterdam
BVV Barendrecht players
Association football midfielders